Marco Antônio de Freitas Filho (born October 23, 1978 in Ribeirão Preto, São Paulo), known as Marco Antônio, is a Brazilian footballer, who plays as a wing forward or as a forward for Botafogo de Ribeirão Preto. His previous clubs include Jeonbuk Hyundai in South Korea, Santa Cruz FC, Atlético Mineiro, Fortaleza, Ceará, União Barbarense, Náutico, São Paulo FC and FBC Unione Venezia in Italy (5th division).

Honors
Campeonato Cearense in 2002 with Ceará Sporting Club
Campeonato Cearense in 2003 with Fortaleza Esporte Clube
Campeonato Pernambucano in 2005 with Santa Cruz FC

References

External links

1978 births
Brazilian footballers
Association football forwards
Living people
Brazilian expatriate footballers
São Paulo FC players
Clube Náutico Capibaribe players
União Agrícola Barbarense Futebol Clube players
Ceará Sporting Club players
Jeonbuk Hyundai Motors players
K League 1 players
Santa Cruz Futebol Clube players
Clube Atlético Mineiro players
Fortaleza Esporte Clube players
Venezia F.C. players
Botafogo Futebol Clube (SP) players
Brazilian expatriate sportspeople in South Korea
Expatriate footballers in South Korea
Expatriate footballers in Italy
Footballers from São Paulo (state)